Gbado Airport  is an airport serving Gbado, Democratic Republic of the Congo.

References

Airports in the Nord-Ubangi Province